Bringer of Blood is the fifth album by the death metal band Six Feet Under. The album achieved a peak position of number 22 on Top Heatseekers for two weeks and number 20 on Independent Albums.

The German limited edition digipack CD in slipcase comes with a bonus DVD titled "The Making of Bringer of Blood" and two bonus tracks. (See Bringer des Blutes, and Unknown)

Track listing
All songs by Six Feet Under.

Personnel
Six Feet Under
Chris Barnes – vocals
Steve Swanson – guitars
Terry Butler – bass
Greg Gall – drums

Production
Produced by Chris Barnes
Engineered by Chris Carroll
Mixed by Chris Barnes, Chris Carroll and Brian Slagel
Mastered by Brad Vance
Artwork
Artwork by David Aronson
Graphics by Brian Ames
Photography by Joe Giron

See also
Six Feet Under
Chris Barnes

References

External links
 Six Feet Under's Home Page

2003 albums
Six Feet Under (band) albums
Metal Blade Records albums
Albums recorded at Morrisound Recording